Chastain is a French surname. Notable people with the surname include:

 Brandi Chastain (born 1968), American soccer player
 David Chastain (born 1963), American guitarist
 Don Chastain (1935–2002), American actor, singer and screenwriter
 Elijah Webb Chastain (1813–1874), American politician, soldier and lawyer
 James Garvin Chastain Sr., cofounder of the National Baptist Convention of Mexico
 Jane Chastain (born 1943), sports announcer and conservative political writer and commentator
 Jessica Chastain (born 1977), American actress and film producer
 Ken Chastain (born 1964), musician, engineer, and producer
 Michael Chastain (born 1955), blind athlete who played high school football in Troy, Michigan
 Nick Chastain (born 1981), American actor
 Ross Chastain (born 1992), American professional stock car racing driver
 Thomas Chastain (1921–1994), American author of crime fiction

Fictional characters
 Misery Chastain, protagonist of fictitious romance novels in Stephen King's book Misery
 Darryl Louise (DL) Chastain, character in Thomas Pynchon's book Vineland.

French-language surnames